Chet Pollert (born April 20, 1955) is an American politician. He is a member of the North Dakota House of Representatives from the 29th District, serving since 1998. He is a member of the Republican party.

In November 2018, members of the House Majority Republican party chose Pollert as their Majority Leader.  In the North Dakota legislature, the Majority Leader holds the most powerful position in the chamber (as opposed to most states, where the Speaker of the House holds this position).  The previous leader, Representative Al Carlson was defeated in his reelection campaign.

References

1955 births
21st-century American politicians
Living people
People from Valley City, North Dakota
Republican Party members of the North Dakota House of Representatives
Valley City State University alumni